Nuxaá Mixtec, also known as Southeastern Nochixtlán Mixtec, is a Mixtec language of Oaxaca. It is not close to other varieties of Mixtec.

References 

Mixtec language

Languages of Mexico